Chou Ching-hui (born 1965) is a Taiwanese artist and photographer.

Biography
Chou was born in 1965 in Taiwan and graduated from the World College of Journalism in Taiwan. 

Chou's interest in photography started in 1988. After completing military service, he has been a photojournalist in Capital Morning News, The Journalist magazine and China Times Weekly in Taiwan. Over these years, he received Taiwan’s annual Top Award in Photojournalism, Silver Medal in the Reportage category. A year later, Chou embarked on his first long-term photography project, "Frozen in Time – Images of a Leper Colony" which was exhibited at Taipei Fine Arts Museum in 1995. The following year, the exhibition was shown at the Tokyo Metropolitan Museum of Photography, and was recorded in Taiwan Photographers.

Every project that Chou created is fully related to social issues. He has received Independence Post Group Annual Taiwan News Award in Graphic Stories category, Golden Cauldron Prize, etc.

Chou's works have been exhibited at Taipei Fine Arts Museum (1995), the Tokyo Metropolitan Museum of Photography (1996), the Pingyao International Photography Festival, Pingyao, China (2002), the Guangdong Provincial Museum (2003), the Shanghai Art Museum (2003), the Guangzhou Photo Biennial (2008, 2009); and the Taiwan Biennial (2008).

Chou's Wild Aspirations – The Yellow Sheep River Project, a picture book series composed of computer images of children of the Yellow Sheep River Area, won the Red Dot Design Award in 2010 and the iF Communication Design Award 2011.

Solo exhibitions
 1995 : Frozen in Time – Chronicle of a Leper Colony, Taipei Fine Arts Museum, Taipei, Taïwan
 1997 : Frozen in Time – Chronicle of a Leper Colony, National Ching-Hua University Arts Center, Hsinchu, Taïwan
 2002 :
 Vanishing Breed – Workers Chronicle, Taipei Fine Arts Museum, Taipei, Taïwan
 Vanishing Breed – Workers Chronicle, The 2nd Pingyao International Photography Festival, Pingyao, Shanxi, China
 2004　: 
 Vanishing Breed – Workers Chronicle, Quanta Building Hall, Taipei, Taïwan
 Vanishing Breed – Workers Chronicle, Immersing in Art, Quanta Campus Tour Exhibition, Taipei, Taïwan
 2009　: Wild Aspirations – The Yellow Sheep River Project, Taipei Fine Arts Museum, Taipei, Taïwan
 2010　: Wild Aspirations – The Yellow Sheep River Project, Istituto degli Innocenti, Florence, Italy
 2015　:
 Animal Farm, MoCA Taipei, Taipei, Taiwan
 Animal Farm, ElsaArt Gallery, Taipei, Taiwan

Group exhibitions
 1989: Juan Yi-chung Darkroom Studio – Image Notebook, Jazz Photo Gallery, Taipei, Taïwan
 1993 : Eslite Six Photographers Exhibition, Eslite Gallery, Taipei, Taïwan
 1995 : Modern Taiwanese Photographers, Okinawa Photography Festival, Japan
 1996 : Frozen in Time – Chronicle of a Leper Colony selected for exhibition in Asian View – Asia in Transition photography exhibition, Tokyo Metropolitan Museum of Photography, Tokyo, Japan
 1997 : Executive director of Seeing the Native Son – Chronicle of Taiwanese Hakka in Shadow and Light, Chung Cheng Gallery, National Taiwan Arts Education Center, Taipei, Taïwan
 Executive director of Taiwan Shiseido – Through the Years, Taipei, Taïwan
 Women, Taipei City Government, Taipei, Taïwan
 Portraits of Taiwan – Classic Chronicle of a Half Century of Faces, Taipei Photography Gallery, Taipei, Taïwan
 1998 : 
 Contemporary Taiwanese Photography group exhibition, NCP Photography Gallery, Hong Kong
 Old-Taipei-People, Taipei City Government, Taipei, Taïwan
 1999 : 
 From Observing to Understanding – Modern Photographic Art from Taiwan 1990-99, Kuo Mu Sheng Foundation Art Center, Taipei, Taïwan
 Industrious Taipei People group exhibition, Taipei City Government, Taipei, Taïwan
 2000 : Third Taipei International Photography Festival, Dr. Sun Yat-sen Memorial Hall Gallery, Taipei, Taïwan
 2003 : Humanism China – A Contemporary Record of Photography, Guangdong Provincial Museum, Guangzhou, China
 2004 : Humanism China – A Contemporary Record of Photography, Shanghai Art Museum, National Art Museum of China, China
 2006　: 
 Humanism China – A Contemporary Record of Photography, Museum für Moderne Kunst in Frankfurt, Staatsgalerie Stuttgart, Germany
 Taipei – Views and Points, Taipei Fine Arts Museum, Taipei, Taïwan
 2007　: 
 Humanism China – A Contemporary Record of Photography, Museum of Photography in Berlin, Pinakothek der Moderne in Munich, Germany
 Evolution, 2007 Guangzhou Photo Biennial exhibition, Guangdong Provincial Museum, Guangzhou, China
 2008 : 
 Humanism China – A Contemporary Record of Photography, Staatliche Kunstsammlungen Dresden, Dresden, Germany
 Humanism China – A Contemporary Record of Photography, Edinburgh City Art Center, Scotland
 Home, 2008 Taiwan Biennial exhibition, National Taiwan Museum of Fine Arts, Taichung, Taïwan
 2009 : Sightings: Searching for the Truth, 2009 Guangzhou Photo Biennial exhibition, Guangdong Provincial Museum, Guangzhou, China
 Cultural Insights from Taiwanese Documentary Photography – Taiwanese Find Arts Series, National Taiwan Museum of Fine Arts, Taichung, Taïwan
 2010 : Four Dimensions – Contemporary Photography from Mainland China, Hong Kong, Taiwan & Macau, Hong Kong Arts Centre, Hong-Kong
 2011 : 
 Stories Developing - 10 Contemporary Photographers of Taiwan, Kaohsiung Museum of Fine Arts, Kaohsiung, Taiwan
 Eye of the Times-Centennial Images of Taiwan, Taipei Fine Arts Museum, Taipei, Taiwan
 2012 : Into Society: Critical Realism in Taiwanese Photographic Arts since 1990, Kaohsiung Museum of Fine Arts, Kaohsiung, Taiwan
 2013 : Innovation&Re-creation, Selected Works from the National Taiwan Museum of Fine Arts Young Artist Collection, National Taiwan Museum of Fine Arts, Taichung, Taïwan
 2014 : The Great Acceleration , 2014 Taipei Biennial, Taipei Fine Arts Museum, Taipei, Taïwan
 2015 : 
 Changjiang International Photography & Video Biennale, Chong Ching, China
 The Hidden Me: Self-Portraits, National Taiwan Museum of Fine Arts, Taichung, Taiwan
 2016 : 
 Animal Farm, Chini Gallery, Taipei, Taïwan
 Animal Farm, La Galerie, Hong-Kong,

Publications
 1989 : Juan Yi-chung Darkroom Studio – Image Notebook, Jen Chien Publishing
 1995 : Modern Taiwanese Photographers – Focus on Chou Ching-hui, Ascending Cultural Enterprises Publishing 
 1996 : Frozen in Time – Chronicle of a Leper Colony collected in Vibrant Asia photography volume, Tokyo Metropolitan Museum of Photography
 1998 : Executive director, Seeing the Native Son – Chronicle of Taiwanese Hakka in Shadow and Light photography volume, Taipei Civil Affairs Bureau
 2001 : Executive director, New Taipei City Yingge Ceramics Museum pictorial notebook project
 2002 : Vanishing Breed – Workers Chronicle exhibition catalogue, Photographers International
 2004 : Out of the Shadows photo album (limited edition), Evermore International Publishing Corporation
 2009 : Wild Aspirations – The Yellow Sheep River Project photo album (limited edition), Taipei Fine Arts Museum

Collections
 National Taiwan Museum of Fine Arts, Taichung, Taiwan 
 Guangdong Provincial Museum, Guangzhou, China

See also
Taiwanese art

References

External links
 La Galerie,Paris 1939, Hong-Kong

1965 births
Taiwanese photographers
Living people